Dacalana cotys, the white-banded royal  is a species of blue butterfly (Lycaenidae) found in South East Asia.

Range
The butterfly occurs in India from Sikkim to Arunachal Pradesh. eastwards and across to northern Nepal, Bhutan, Myanmar. and Thailand.

Taxonomy
The butterfly was previously classified as Pratapa cotys, Ancema cotys and Camana cotys.

Status
Not common as per Wynter-Blyth. Not rare as per Evans.

Description

The butterfly has a wingspan of 33 to 37 mm.

The upperside of the male is a bright azure blue with a black border at the apex ranging from 0.5 to 5 mm at the apex. On the hindwing is a mid-costal white patch.  The male has a brand on the upperside of the forewing. The female is paler with a prominent white patch at the end cell of the forewing.

On the underside, the butterfly has a white band on a pale-brown background which broadens towards the costa and dorsum. There is a lot of seasonal variation in the band width.

Habit and habitat

It is mostly seen in wooded slopes of Himalaya. They are confined to forested area, often in the upper canopy. Males are often seen mud-puddling.

See also
Lycaenidae
List of butterflies of India (Lycaenidae)

Cited references

References
  
 
 
 
 
 Yutaka Inayoshi, A Check List of Butterflies in Indo-China, page on Family Lycaenidae (accessed on 7 August 2007).

Dacalana
Butterflies of Asia